Sweltsa townesi is a species of the stonefly genus Sweltsa. Its known range is in the Sierra Nevada Mountains of California and Nevada.

References

Chloroperlidae
Fauna of the Sierra Nevada (United States)